MicroLeague Baseball is a 1984 baseball simulation video game. It was developed by MicroLeague and published by MicroLeague It was released on Amiga, Apple II, Atari 8-bit family, Atari ST, Commodore 64, and IBM PC compatibles.

Summary
It was one of the first video games to carry the Major League Baseball license, allowing the game to feature MLB teams. It also carried the Major League Baseball Players Association license, allowing the game to use real players.

A general manager disk available separately allowed users to make trades with other teams or create their own players. A stat compiler disk allowed players to save the results of every played game and compile statistics for each player, allowing users to play an entire season. The game was unique for its time for its concentration on management. Things like batter stance and fielder placement were all possible for the first time in a licensed baseball game.

The original game came with a variety of all-time great teams, including the 1927 New York Yankees, 1955 Brooklyn Dodgers, 1961 New York Yankees, 1963 Los Angeles Dodgers, 1967 St. Louis Cardinals, 1968 Detroit Tigers, 1969 New York Mets, 1970 Baltimore Orioles, 1973 Oakland Athletics, 1975 Cincinnati Reds, 1975 Boston Red Sox, 1979 Pittsburgh Pirates, 1980 Philadelphia Phillies, 1980 Kansas City Royals and the 1982 Milwaukee Brewers. Additionally, the game included an AL All-Time Greats team as well as an NL All-Time Greats Team. Further, the game also included the 1984 AL and NL All-Star Game rosters. The roster size for all teams was 15 hitters and ten pitchers.

Reception
Computer Gaming World in 1985 praised MicroLeague Baseballs graphics but noted that it did not keep individual statistics. Ahoy! called it "a rock-solid stat game dressed up in visuals which would do any action baseball game proud", concluding that "MicroLeague Baseball is highly recommended for baseball-loving computerists".

References

External links
 
 
 Stadium 64: MicroLeague Baseball

1984 video games
Amiga games
Apple II games
Atari 8-bit family games
Atari ST games
Commodore 64 games
Major League Baseball video games
MicroLeague games
Multiplayer and single-player video games
Video games developed in the United States